Leonid Grinev (born 1882, date of death unknown) was a Russian fencer. He competed in the individual foil event at the 1912 Summer Olympics.

References

1882 births
Year of death missing
Male fencers from the Russian Empire
Olympic competitors for the Russian Empire
Fencers at the 1912 Summer Olympics